Wit at Several Weapons is a seventeenth-century comedy of uncertain date and authorship.

Authorship and date
In its own century, the play appeared in print only in the two Beaumont and Fletcher folios of 1647 and 1679; yet modern scholarship has determined that Wit at Several Weapons is a collaboration between Thomas Middleton and William Rowley, written some three decades before its publication.

In addition to the play's appearance in both folios, its belated entry in the Stationers' Register on 29 June 1660 also assigns it to Beaumont and Fletcher. The Epilogue to the play in the folios refers to a limited Fletcherian role in the play's authorship: "...if he but writ / An act, or two...." Yet the play itself indicates that Fletcher's contribution may be more minor than that; Fletcher's highly characteristic pattern of linguistic preferences (ye for you, 'em for them, etc.) is lacking in the play. David Lake confirms the presence of Middleton and Rowley that earlier scholars like Cyrus Hoy had detected. Where other critics had dated the play anywhere from 1609 to 1620, Lake favors a date in the later part of 1613 based on topical allusions.

Lake's analysis of the play's internal evidence yielded the following division of shares of authorship:

Middleton — Act I, scene 1; Act II, 1; Act III; Act IV;
Rowley — Act I, scene 2; Act II, 2–4; Act V.

The overall division is one typical of Middleton/Rowley collaborations, in which Middleton took primary responsibility for the main plot, and Rowley for the comic subplot. References in the text indicate that the clown character Pompey Doodle is a fat clown, a kind of part that Rowley repeatedly wrote for himself to play.

Influence
No data on the drama's stage premiere or pre-1642 productions has survived. The play is thought to have influenced Sir William Davenant when he wrote his The Wits (published 1636), and John Dryden borrowed from it for his first play, The Wild Gallant (1663). Wit at Several Weapons was adapted and revived by Colley Cibber as The Rival Fools, acted and printed in 1709. Reportedly, it was not a success.

Synopsis
Sir Perfidious Oldcraft is a self-described practitioner and admirer of "wit". (In the English Renaissance, the word covered everything from prodigious intellect to cleverness, street smarts to practical jokes.) He is so dedicated to the concept that when his son Wittypate Oldcraft turns twenty-one, Sir Perfidious kicks him out of the family manse with no income, to live by his wits. The son decides to fulfill his father's dictates with a vengeance, by making his father his wits' target.

The old knight is also the guardian of a Niece (otherwise unnamed, as is Middleton's recurrent practice in his plays). Sir Perfidious has arranged a marriage between his Niece and a local knight, Sir Gregory Fop. His name clues the audience that the intended bridegroom is a fool. Sir Gregory comes to meet his intended bride with a witty friend named Cunningham (the play text pronounces his name "cunning game"). As a practical joke — his idea of a witticism — Sir Perfidious lets his Niece believe that Cunningham is her future husband, before introducing her to the real Sir Gregory.

But the Niece and Cunningham instantly feel a powerful attraction to each other, much to the old knight's displeasure. The Niece is repelled by the idea of accepting Fop in Cunningham's place; but her uncle's threats to isolate her force her to conceal her real feelings and appear to comply — while ruthlessly berating, ridiculing, and manipulating Sir Gregory in private. She also flirts with Sir Gregory's clown, Pompey Doodle — so blatantly that Cunningham's jealousy is aroused, proving that he loves her. He then collaborates in her scheme. In the end, Fop's spirit is so beaten-down that he marries a poor woman who treats him with respect and consideration, rather than the wealthy Niece who scorns and belittles him at every turn. This leaves the Niece free to marry the poor but desirable Cunningham.

Wittypate Oldcraft falls in with a group of cheats and con-men: Sir Ruinous Gentry is a "decayed knight", and Priscian is a "poor scholar". The knight's wife, Lady Ruinous, is the fourth member of the crew. The quartet pursue an escalating series of cons against Sir Perfidious that deprive him of more than two hundred pounds of his cash. Cunningham joins and co-operates with the cheaters.

In the end, Sir Perfidious realizes that Wittypate has cheated him repeatedly. Conceding that his son has done an excellent job of living by his wits, the old knight gives Wittypate the yearly income of £200 that he'd requested in the first place.

Characters
(Character descriptions derive from the 1679 folio.)
 Sir Perfidious Oldcraft, an old knight, a great admirer of wit.
 Wittypate Oldcraft, his father's own son.
 Sir Gregory Fop, a witless lord of land.
 Cunningame, a discreet gentleman, Sir Gregory's comrade and supplanter.
 Sir Ruinous Gentry, a decayed knight.
 Priscian, a poor scholar.
 Pompey Doodle, a clown, Sir Gregory's man.
 Mr. Credulous, nephew to Sir Perfidious, a shallow-brained scholar.
 Boy, a singer.
 Servant to Sir and Lady Ruinous Gentry.
 Servant to Sir Perfidious Oldcraft.
 2 Servants at a tavern.
 Niece to Sir Perfidious, a rich and witty heir.
 Lady Ruinous, wife to Sir Ruinous.
 Guardianess to Sir Perfidious's Niece, an old doting crone.
 Mirabell, the Guardianess's niece.

Notes

References
 Lake, David J. The Canon of Thomas Middleton's Plays. Cambridge: Cambridge University Press, 1975.
 Logan, Terence P., and Denzell S. Smith, eds. The Popular School: A Survey and Bibliography of Recent Studies in English Renaissance Drama. Lincoln, NE: University of Nebraska Press, 1975.
 Oliphant, E. H. C. The Plays of Beaumont and Fletcher: An Attempt to Determine Their Respective Shares and the Shares of Others. New Haven, CT: Yale University Press, 1927.
 Wilcox, John. The Relation of Molière to Restoration Comedy. New York: Columbia University Press, 1938.

English Renaissance plays
Plays by Thomas Middleton
Plays by William Rowley
17th-century plays